Coin manipulation is the art of manipulating coins in skillful flourishes, usually on or around the hands. Although not always considered coin magic, the tricks are sometimes used in magic shows. The difficulty of the trick ranges greatly, from some that take a few minutes to accomplish, to much more complex ones that can take months, even years, to master. One of the best-known tricks is the relatively advanced coin walk.

Coin walk
The coin walk is a type of coin trick in which a coin is flipped over the fingers to create the illusion of a coin walking across the back of the hand. It is one of the most famous coin manipulation tricks. It is also known as the coin roll, knuckle roll, and the steeplechase flourish, and can also be performed with poker chips, slugs, or other similar implements.

The trick is generally performed on the first phalanx bone of each finger of one hand. After the coin has been flipped over by each phalanx, not including the smallest finger, the thumb brings the coin back under the hand and back to the index finger to repeat the trick as many times as desired.

In popular culture
Van Heflin's character Sam performs this manipulation throughout the 1946 film The Strange Love of Martha Ivers. Woody Allen's character Miles Monroe also performs this trick to seduce Diane Keaton's character Luna in the 1973 film Sleeper.
The characters Peter, Walter, and Elizabeth Bishop perform this trick in the TV show Fringe. Steve Carell and Alan Arkin also perform the trick in tandem (almost a "dueling knuckle walk") in the movie The Incredible Burt Wonderstone. In the 2017 Indian Tamil film Bairavaa, the protagonist (Vijay) is shown doing this trick several times throughout the film. Connor, a protagonist in the 2018 game Detroit: Become Human, is shown doing various coin tricks as the player progresses through the game. Actor Val Kilmer can be seen doing the trick in both Tombstone as Doc Holliday and in the movie Real Genius'', performing a double-handed continuous hand roll.

See also
 Pen spinning

References

External links
 

Sleight of hand
Coins
Coin magic
Object manipulation